The , also known as Ace, Viki, Sherpa, 500/600/700, Mini Jumbo, Mini Subaru or M60/M70/M80 in various export markets, is a kei class automobile produced from 1972 to 1992 mainly for sale in Japan by Subaru, although it was also sold in Europe, South America, Australia and the Caribbean. The Rex superseded the R-2 as Subaru's kei car, and has been available in commercial use versions as well as in a passenger car version. It underwent major changes in 1976, in fall 1981, and again in late 1986. The second generation Rex (1981–1986) also formed the basis for the larger Subaru Justy.

The name "Rex" comes from the Latin word for "king". In some export markets, the Sambar microvan has been marketed as the "Rex Combi".

The "Rex" nameplate has been reused since 2022 as a subcompact crossover SUV based on the A200 series Daihatsu Rocky.

First generation

The Rex (K21), introduced 15 July 1972, was the replacement for the Subaru R-2, which was itself the replacement for the long lived, but outdated Subaru 360. Because the R-2 was based largely on the 360, originally including its air-cooled two-stroke engine, it lasted for not even three years. In contrast, the 360 was produced for 11 years and the rear-engined Rex was produced for nine.

The Subaru Rex represented a fresh start designwise, sharing little of its appearance with the Subaru 360, although they were mechanically the same and shared a rear-engine layout. The Rex also retained the 360/R-2's rear swing axle. The appearance of the new Rex was similar to Subaru's new compact car, the Leone. The Rex originally featured the same water-cooled 356 cc EK34 two-stroke engine as used in the R-2, and was available only as a two-door sedan. In February 1973 a four-door sedan was added. The Van was registerable as a commercial vehicle, allowing for considerable savings in taxes and fees. The EK34 engine came with a  single carburetor on the Custom L, Super L, and other trim levels down to Standard, or a  double carburetor for the sporty GSR. The TS (Touring Sport) received a  iteration. The GSR was also somewhat lower than its counterparts, due to radial tires being fitted.

In October 1973 the two-stroke was replaced by a 358 cc rear-mounted, watercooled, two-cylinder, four-stroke engine called the EK21. The car also received a minor facelift (with a "frowny" rather than the smiling grille seen on the turquoise four-door in the infobox being the most obvious difference) and a new chassis code: K22. Front disc brakes were also introduced as an option at the same time. The three-door, two-seater "Van" (K42) arrived in February of the next year, when a five-speed version (Custom5) was also added. The Van's engine was in a lesser state of tune and produces .

In September 1974, along with a minor facelift consisting of a new grille and bumpers adjusted to allow for the fitment of larger license plates, a "Wagon" version (K26) appeared. This received four permanent seats, but was no longer registerable as a commercial vehicle and had a considerably lower max load. At the same time, a "Super L" version of the Van was added. In April 1975 the Van received a higher roof and became a four-seater. This was necessitated by Japanese commercial vehicle regulation which require the floor to be completely flat when the rear seat is folded. Because the Rex's engine was mounted in the rear, the cargo floor was rather high, meaning that more head room would be required before a seat could be installed. The Wagon continued in production until the SEEC-T version was introduced in December, but it lost most of its market with the availability of a four-seater Van.

28 PS became the power output of all versions of the Rex for model year 1976 after the SEEC-T (Subaru Exhaust Emission Control - Thermal and Thermodynamic) emissions control system was introduced in December 1975. The equipment levels were also reshuffled, with the B-type replacing the Standard and then rising from the A via the AG and A to the AG on top. The A and AG versions received disc brakes in front, but the five-speed was no longer available.

550 cc era

In response to new regulations for Kei cars introduced for 1976, Subaru introduced the larger-engined Rex 5 in May of that year. It retained the earlier bodywork (albeit broadened by 10 cm and with a lengthened bonnet for an overall length of ) but got a 490 cc version of the same engine. The Rex 5 (K23, K43 in the Van version) engine was still of two cylinders and an overhead cam design, and retained the SEEC-T emissions control system. The AG version was dropped. The Van version received a  engine (at 6000 rpm) with the same torque, albeit at 500 rpm lower. Van equipment levels were Standard and Super Deluxe. This version (called the Subaru 500 in the export) was short-lived, replaced by the bigger Rex 550 exactly one year after being introduced.

The Rex 550, introduced in May 1977, featured the SEEC-T equipped watercooled, two-cylinder, four-stroke 544 cc EK23 series engine. Chassis code was K24, It remained rear-mounted, coupled to a four-speed manual gearbox. A comparatively well-equipped Custom L version of the Van (K44) was added. The Van could take a max load of only , 100 kg less than most of its competitors. This was counteracted by the comparatively high level of passenger comfort in the Rex Van.

The Rex 550 was called the Subaru 600 in most export markets. Subaru made much of the "Multi-Use Lever", which combined the headlight, turn signal, and windshield washer functions. This was not installed on the lowest spec versions (Type B, Standard).

In March 1978 the Swingback version was added, a two-door sedan which received a larger, opening rear window. The large rear window necessitated a slightly smaller opening to the engine compartment, but this was more than made up for by allowing for access to the rear luggage compartment from the outside. In March 1979, the Rex underwent a very minor facelift, the most visible results being new rims and slightly differing bumpers and a small spoiler in front. Then, in response to the very low priced Suzuki Alto, a decontented version of the Van called "Family Rex" was added in October 1979. It was priced at a very low ¥480,000 (under US$2,000 at the time). An automatic clutch option was added on several Rex models in March 1980.

Second generation

In August 1981, the second-generation Subaru Rex became front-wheel drive, with all-new bodywork and independent suspension all around. At the time, it was stated that the only parts of the rear-engined predecessor to have remained were "two connecting rods and an ashtray". Three and five-door hatchback versions were available. Optional on-demand 4WD became available after October 1983, a first for the class. The 4WD system was electrically engaged by depressing an embedded switch on top of the gear shift. The option of a turbo was introduced on the 4WD Rex in December 1983, to counteract the added weight of the drive system. The "Rex Dinos", a trim level introduced in 1982, was only available by mail order catalog.

In the European markets, this car was originally marketed as the Subaru 600 or Mini Jumbo. In September 1982 it became the Subaru 700, as it received a larger 665 cc version of the two-cylinder, producing  (a 35 PS version using lower octane gas was also available). The engine used a single-barrel carburettor. These cars were 9 cm longer than their domestic counterparts, due to bigger bumpers, and received 12-inch wheels (rather than the ten-inch units used for most models in Japan). Production ended in September 1986, as Subaru was getting ready to introduce the modernized third generation Rex.

The bodyshell of the second generation Rex was also lengthened and widened to become the original Subaru Justy, with a larger 1-litre engine. The Justy remained in production until 1994, outliving the next generation Rex and even the Rex label itself.

Yunque

Chinese Yunque (Guizhou Aircraft Industry Corporation) built the second generation Subaru Rex under license as the Yunque GHK 7060 between 1991 and 2005. There were also GHK 7060A 'Free Wind' and GHK 7071A 'WOW' iterations, featuring interesting bodykits.

Third generation

The third generation (KG/KN) was presented in November 1986 with the commercial spec Rex Combi with either three or five doors (KG1, KG2 with four-wheel drive). The sedan version, intended for private use, was added a month later. The passenger version was called simply "Rex" and was originally only available with five doors; its chassis codes are KN1 (FF) or KN2 (4WD). There was no turbo version of the new Rex. A two-speed automatic transmission was also available, as was a part-time 4WD system. "Twin Viscous" full-time 4WD with a limited slip differential for the rear axle was made available in February 1987. From this point on, all four-wheel drives received the more powerful three-valve engine. A CVT transmission was added June 1987, called ECVT.

A supercharged version with an intercooler and electronic fuel injection was added to the options list March 1988 as a response to the success of the Alto Works and Mira TR-XX. A supercharger meant less lag than for a turbo, although specific output tended to be somewhat lower than the competition. This was available for both the 3- and 5-door versions. May 1988 saw an available electrically deployed canvas top added to the three-door.

This was the first Kei four-cylinder since the Mazda Carol, and was unique to the class. Naturally aspirated models received "cat's eye"-shaped headlamps and a reshaped bonnet while the supercharged models retained the earlier rectangular units, albeit with a new four-hole grille. This, the KH1/2 series Rex (KP1/2 for the commercial Rex Combis), remained available in combination with the ECVT transmission and four-wheel-drive versions, but the two-speed automatic was dropped. In July, export versions (M70 in Europe, Sherpa in Australia) received the same changes and switched from the 665 cc  two-cylinder to become the M80 in Europe, the Ace in New Zealand and the Fiori in Australia.

The 550 cc four-cylinder iteration was uncommonly short-lived, as in March 1990 another facelift followed, with a 660 cc version of the EN engine (EN07) and an extended, more rounded nose because of new Kei regulations taking effect. These external differences did not appear in the Australian market until August, and in Europe (Mini Jumbo, M80) by early 1991. This, which was to be the last Rex, received chassis codes KH3 (FF sedan), KH4 (4WD sedan), KP3 (FF commercial), and KP4 (4WD commercial).

Rex is also a common nickname for the high-performance Subaru Impreza WRX, especially in Australia where the actual Rex was originally marketed as the Sherpa and then as the Fiori. The Fiori derivative (sold as such from summer 1989) was also equipped with pink and blue pinstriping from the factory, and a two-year, 50,000 km warranty was offered when new. Equipped with a different engine, the Fiori had Subaru's 758 cc carburetted four-cylinder EN08 powerplant. This engine, producing  at 6,000 rpm, was also used in those European markets that received the Rex and in New Zealand's Ace. In Europe it was rebadged M80 to reflect the engine displacement. The M80 was available as a three or a five-door, in DX and SDX versions, with the SDX receiving a standard five-speed manual. Top speed was 125 km/h for four-speeds, 130 km/h for five-speeds.

This generation Rex was marketed as the Viki in certain Southeast Asian markets, a name which was also used for a special edition (Rex ViKi) in the Japanese domestic market. The end for the Rex came in March 1992, when it was replaced by the Vivio. A total of 1,902,811 Subaru Rexes were built in its lifetime. Recently the Rex has become somewhat of a cult car in Japan, being popular in front-wheel-drive drift events.

References

External links

 History of Subaru Kei Jidosha

Rex
Kei cars
All-wheel-drive vehicles
Front-wheel-drive vehicles
Rear-wheel-drive vehicles
Vehicles with CVT transmission
Cars introduced in 1972
1980s cars
1990s cars
Rear-engined vehicles